Amdouni is a surname. Notable people with the surname include:

 Ghali (rapper) (Ghali Amdouni, born 1993), Italian rapper and record producer
 Morhad Amdouni (born 1988), French middle and long-distance runner
 Zeki Amdouni (born 2000), Swiss footballer